The 2002 Elite League speedway season was the 68th season of the top division of speedway in the United Kingdom and in 2002 was governed by the Speedway Control Board (SCB), in conjunction with the British Speedway Promoters' Association (BSPA). It was the first time that playoffs were introduced to determine the champions.

Season summary
In 2002, the league consisted of nine teams. The title was decided by a play-off between the top five teams. The team that finished top of the table were seeded directly to the final. The next four met in quarter and semi final rounds. The winner of these rounds qualified for the final.

Eastbourne Eagles topped the regular season table but were defeated by Wolverhampton Wolves for the league title when losing the play off final. It was Wolves third title success in 11 years and the Swedish Karlsson brothers, Peter Karlsson and Mikael Karlsson were once again integral to the Wolves team throughout the season. Eastbourne's season was not a total loss because they beat Peterborough in the final of the Knockout Cup thanks to efforts from their English rider contingent of Mark Loram, Joe Screen and Dean Barker. 

Tony Rickardsson became World Champion for the fifth time during the season, topped the league averages, won the Elite League Riders' Championship and helped his club Poole win the Craven Shield.

Final table

Peterborough v Oxford not held.

Play-offs
Quarter-final and Semi-final decided over one leg. Grand Final decided by aggregate scores over two legs.

Quarter-finals
Wolverhampton Wolves 50-39 Peterborough Panthers
Coventry Bees 59-31 Poole Pirates

Semi-finals
Wolverhampton Wolves 51-39 Coventry Bees

Final

First leg

Second leg

The Wolverhampton Wolves were declared League Champions, winning on aggregate 93-87.

Elite League Knockout Cup
The 2002 Elite League Knockout Cup was the 64th edition of the Knockout Cup for tier one teams. Eastbourne Eagles were the winners of the competition.

First round

Quarter-finals

Semi-finals

Final

First leg

Second leg

The Eastbourne Eagles were declared Knockout Cup Champions, winning on aggregate 94-86.

Leading final averages

Riders & final averages
Belle Vue

 10.44
 8.41
 6.89
 6.38
 5.67
 4.71
 4.57
 3.95
 2.38
 1.24
 1.10

Coventry

 9.39
 8.97
 8.72
 6.87
 5.82
 5.81
 5.28
 1.52

Eastbourne

 9.56
 8.46
 7.81
 7.21
 7.17
 6.54
 5.88
 4.14

Ipswich

 9.76
 7.91
 7.15
 6.51
 5.95
 5.10
 4.95
 4.76
 4.00
 3.52

King's Lynn

 8.47
 7.26 
 6.33
 5.53
 5.23
 4.27
 4.21
 3.58
 3.40

Oxford

 10.10 
 6.83
 6.29
 5.56
 5.50
 4.92
 2.90
 2.07

Peterborough

 10.34
 6.98
 6.88
 6.54
 6.47
 6.13
 5.87
 5.00
 3.75
 3.08

Poole

 10.88
 6.82
 6.70
 6.56
 6.32
 6.20
 6.00
 5.41
 4.43
 4.34
 3.88

Wolverhampton

 9.93
 9.23
 7.32
 7.27
 6.80
 6.67
 5.81
 4.08
 1.56

See also
 Speedway in the United Kingdom
 List of United Kingdom Speedway League Champions
 Knockout Cup (speedway)

References

SGB Premiership
2002 in British motorsport